Worcester is a cathedral city in Worcestershire, England, of which it is the county town. The population was 103,872 in the 2021 census.

The River Severn flanks the western side of the city centre. It is overlooked by Worcester Cathedral. Worcester is the home of Royal Worcester Porcelain, composer Edward Elgar, Lea & Perrins, makers of traditional Worcestershire sauce, the University of Worcester, and Berrow's Worcester Journal, claimed as the world's oldest newspaper.

The Battle of Worcester in 1651 was the final battle of the English Civil War, during which Oliver Cromwell's New Model Army defeated King Charles II's Royalists.

History

Early history
The trade route past Worcester, later part of the Roman Ryknild Street, dates from Neolithic times. It commanded a ford crossing over the River Severn, which was tidal below Worcester, and fortified by the Britons about 400 BC.

Charcoal from the Forest of Dean enabled Romans to operate pottery kilns and ironworks. They may have built a small fort. There is no sign of municipal buildings to indicate an administrative role.

In the 3rd century AD, Roman Worcester occupied a larger area than the subsequent medieval city, but silting caused the abandonment of Sidbury. Industrial production ceased and the settlement contracted to a defended position along the lines of the old British fort at the river terrace's southern end.

Anglo-Saxon town

The form of the place name varied over time. At its settlement in the 7th century by the Angles of Mercia it was Weogorna. After centuries of warfare against the Vikings and Danelaw it had become a centre for the Anglo-Saxon army or here known as Weogorna ceastre (Worcester Camp) including Saxons Lode station. The Weorgoran were probably a sub-tribe of the larger kingdom of the Hwicce, which occupied present-day Worcestershire, Gloucestershire and western Wiltshire. In 680, Worcester was chosen as their fort over the larger Gloucester, and the royal court at Winchcombe as the episcopal see of a new bishopric, suggesting there was already an established and powerful Christian community.

Worcester became a centre of monastic learning and church power. Oswald of Worcester, appointed Bishop in 961, was an important reformer alongside the Archbishop of York. The last Anglo-Saxon Bishop of Worcester, St Wulfstan or Wulstan, was a reformer, who remained in office until he died in 1095.

The city also became a focus of violent tax resistance against the Danish Harthacanute in 1041. The townspeople tried to defend themselves by occupying the Severn island of Bevere, two miles up river. After Harthacnut's men had sacked the city and set it alight, agreement was reached and the populace returned to rebuild.

Medieval

Norman Conquest
The first Norman Sheriff of Worcestershire, Urse d'Abetot oversaw the construction of a new castle at Worcester, although nothing now remains of the castle. Worcester Castle was in place by 1069, its outer bailey built on land that had previously been the cemetery for the monks of the Worcester cathedral chapter. The motte of the castle overlooked the river, just south of the cathedral.

Early medieval
Worcester's growth and position as a market town for goods and produce rested on its river crossing and bridge and its position on the road network. The nearest Severn bridges in the 14th century were at Gloucester and Bridgnorth. The main road from London to mid-Wales ran through Worcester, then north-west to Kidderminster, Bridgnorth and Shrewsbury, and via Bromsgrove to Coventry and on to Derby. Southward it connected with Tewkesbury and Gloucester.

Worcester was a centre of religious life. The several monasteries up to the dissolution included Greyfriars, Blackfriars, the Penitent Sisters, and the Benedictine Priory, now Worcester Cathedral. Monastic houses provided hospital and educational services, including Worcester School.

The 12th-century town (then better defended) was attacked in 1139, 1150 and 1151 during the civil war between King Stephen and Empress Matilda, daughter of Henry I. The 1139 attack again resulted in a fire that destroyed part of the city, with citizens being held for ransom. Another fire in 1189 destroyed much of the city for the fourth time that century.

Worcester received its first royal charter in 1189. In 1227 under a new charter allowed a guild of merchants was created, with a trading monopoly for those admitted. Worcester's institutions grew more slowly than those of most county towns.

Jewish persecution and expulsions

Worcester had a small Jewish population by the late 12th century. Jewish life probably centred round what is now Copenhagen Street.

The Diocese was hostile to the Jewish community. Peter of Blois was commissioned by a Bishop of Worcester, probably John of Coutances, to write an anti-Judaic treatise around 1190.

William de Blois as Bishop of Worcester imposed strict rules on Jews within the diocese in 1219. As elsewhere in England, Jews had to wear square white badges, supposedly representing tabulae. Blois wrote to Pope Gregory IX in 1229 to request further powers of enforcement.

In 1263 Worcester's Jewish residents were attacked by a baronial force under Robert Earl Ferrers and Henry de Montfort. Most were killed. The Worcester massacre was part of a wider campaign by allies of Simon de Montfort at the start of the Second Barons' War. In 1275, Jews still in Worcester were expelled to Hereford.

Late medieval
Worcester elected its Member of Parliament at the Guildhall, by the loudest shout rather than the raising of hands. Members of Parliament had to own freehold property worth 40 shillings a year. Their wages were levied by the Constable.

The city council was organised by a system of co-option, with 24 members of the high chamber and 48 of the lower. Committees appointed two bailiffs and made financial decisions; the two chambers agreed the city's rules or ordinances.

By late medieval times the population had reached 1,025 families, excluding the cathedral quarter, so that it probably stood under 10,000. Worcester's suburbs extended beyond the limits of its walls

Manufacture of cloth and allied trades was significant for the city.

Craft guilds
Medieval and early modern Worcester developed a system of craft guilds to regulate who could work in a trade, lay down trade practices and training, and provide social support for members. The city's late medieval ordinances banned tilers from forming a guild and encouraged tilers to settle in Worcester to trade freely. Roofs of thatch and wooden chimneys were banned to reduce risks of fire.

Early modern period

 The Dissolution saw the Priory's status change, as it lost its Benedictine monks. As elsewhere, Worcester had to set up "public" schools to replace monastic education. This led to the establishment of King's School. Worcester School continued to teach. St Oswald's Hospital survived the dissolution, later providing almshouses; the charity and its housing survives to the present day.

The city gained the right to elect a mayor, and was designated a county corporate in 1621, giving it autonomy from local government. Thereafter Worcester was governed by a mayor, recorder and six aldermen. Councillors were selected by co-option.

Worcester contained green spaces such as orchards and fields between its main streets, within the city wall, as appears on Speed's map of 1610. The walls were still more or less complete at the time, but suburbs had been established beyond them.

Civil war

Worcester equivocated, but eventually sided with Parliament before the outbreak of civil war in 1642 but swiftly occupied by the Royalists. Parliament briefly retook the city for Parliament after the Battle of Powick Bridge, and ransacked the cathedral. Stained glass was smashed and the organ destroyed, along with library books and monuments.

Essex was soon forced to withdraw, and the city spent the rest of the war under Royalist occupation. Worcester was a garrison town and had to sustain and billet a large number of Royalist troops. During the Royalist occupation, the suburbs were destroyed to make defence easier. High taxation was imposed, and many male residents pressed into the army.

As Royalist power collapsed in May 1646, Worcester was placed under siege. Worcester had some 5,000 civilians and a Royalist garrison of about 1,500 men facing a New Model Army force of 2,500–5,000. The city surrendered on 23 July.

In 1651 a Scottish army, 16,000 strong, marched south along the west coast in support of Charles II's attempt to regain the Crown. As the army approached, Worcester Council voted to surrender, fearing further violence and destruction. The Parliamentary garrison withdrew to Evesham in the face of the overwhelming numbers against them. The Scots were billeted in and around the city, joined by very limited local forces.

The Battle of Worcester took place on 3 September 1651. Charles II was easily defeated by Cromwell's forces of 30,000 men. Charles II returned to his headquarters in what is now known as King Charles House in the Cornmarket, before fleeing in disguise with Talbot's help to Boscobel House in Shropshire, from where he eventually escaped to France. Worcester was then heavily looted by the Parliamentarian army. The city council estimated £80,000 of damage was done and subsequent debts were still not recovered in the 1670s.

After the Restoration

After the restoration of the monarchy in 1660, Worcester cleverly used its location as the site of the final battles of the First Civil War (1646) and Third Civil War (1651) to mount an appeal for compensation from Charles II. Though not based on historical fact, it invented the epithet Fidelis Civitas (The Faithful City), since included in the city's coat of arms.

The Guildhall rebuilt in 1721 to replace an earlier one on the site is a Grade I listed Queen Anne-style building described by Pevsner as a town hall "as splendid as any of C18 England".

Worcester's historic bridge was replaced in 1781. As the city population expanded, the green areas between the main streets filled with housing and back streets, so that the extent of the city and suburbs remained much the same as in the early 1600s. Large stretches of the city walls had been removed by 1796. Meanwhile, the Royal Worcester Porcelain Company factory was founded by Dr John Wall in 1751.

Industrial revolution and Victorian era

Worcester in the late 18th and early 19th centuries was a major centre for glove-making, employing nearly half the glovers in England at its peak (over 30,000 people). In 1815 the Worcester and Birmingham Canal opened.

Riots took place in 1831, in response to the defeat of the Reform Bill, reflecting discontent with the city administration and the lack of democratic representation. Citizens petitioned the House of Lords for permission to build a County Hall. Local government reform took place in 1835, which for the first time created election procedures for councillors, but also restricted the ability of the city to buy and sell property. Political corruption, particularly bribing of voters, was endemic in Parliamentary elections, contributing to a string of Conservative victories even against a wider swing to the Liberals, and was investigated in the 1890s and by a Royal Commission in 1906.

The British Medical Association (BMA) was founded in the Board Room of the old Worcester Royal Infirmary building in Castle Street in 1832.

Railways reached Worcester in 1850, with Shrub Hill, initially only running to Birmingham. Foregate Street was opened in 1860. The WMR lines became part of the Great Western Railway after 1 August 1863. The railways also gave Worcester thousands of jobs building passenger coaches and signalling.

In 1882 Worcester hosted the Worcestershire Exhibition with sections for fine arts, historical manuscripts and industrial items, receiving over 222,000 visitors.

20th century to present

Worcester was a centre for recruitment of soldiers to fight in the First World War, into the Worcestershire Regiment, based at Norton Barracks. The regiment took part in early battles in the war, most notably at the Battle of Gheluvelt in October 1914.

The Vicar of St Paul's, Geoffrey Studdert Kennedy, became an army chaplain, later known as 'Woodbine Willy', as he brought cigarettes to soldiers during fighting and exposed himself to physical danger.

Rail reorganisation in 1922 saw the Midland Railway's routes from Shrub Hill absorbed into the London, Midland and Scottish Railway.

During the Second World War, the city was chosen to be the seat of an evacuated government in case of mass German invasion. The former RAF station RAF Worcester was located north-east of Worcester.

A fuel-storage depot was built for the government in 1941–42 by Shell Mex & BP (later operated by Texaco) on the eastern bank of the River Severn, about a mile south of Worcester. It was at one time used as a civil reserve storing gas oil and then aviation kerosene for USAFE. It closed in the early 1990s.

In the 1950s and 1960s large areas of the medieval centre of Worcester were demolished and rebuilt. This was condemned by many such as Nikolaus Pevsner who described it as a "totally incomprehensible... act of self-mutilation". There is however still a significant area of medieval Worcester remaining, examples of which can be seen along City Walls Road, Friar Street and New Street.

The current city boundaries date from 1974, when the Local Government Act 1972 created the non-metropolitan district of Worcester, comprising the former county borough with the parishes of Warndon and St. Peter the Great County. City status transferred from the county borough to the new district.

Governance

There is currently no overall control of the council. It is led by Conservative councillor Marc Bayliss. Local political parties represented are the Conservatives, Labour, Greens and Liberal Democrats.

Worcester's one Member of Parliament (MP) is Robin Walker of the Conservative Party, who has represented the constituency since the May 2010 general election.

The County of Worcestershire's local-government arrangement is formed of a non-metropolitan county council (Worcestershire County Council) and six non-metropolitan district councils, with Worcester City Council being the district council for most of Worcester with a small area of the St Peters suburb falling under the jurisdiction of the neighbouring Wychavon District council. The Worcester City Council area includes two parish councils, Warndon Parish Council and St Peter the Great Parish Council, while the village of Claines, located to the north of the city, also falls within the administrative area of Worcester City Council.

Worcester Guildhall houses the local council and dates from 1721 (see History).

Coat of arms
The city of Worcester is unusual among English cities in having an arms of alliance as the main part of its coat of arms. The shield on the dexter side is the "ancient" arms: Quarterly sable and gules, a castle triple-towered argent. First recorded in 1569 but probably older, there is little doubt that it refers to Worcester Castle, now vanished. The shield on the sinister side is the "modern" arms: Argent, a fess between three pears sable. Despite its name, the modern arms goes back to 1634. It is said to represent a visit of Queen Elizabeth I to the city in 1575, when according to folklore, she saw a tree with black pears on Foregate and was so impressed with it that she allowed Worcester to have pears on its coat of arms. The city has used several mottos: one is Floreat semper fidelis civitas, Latin for "Let the faithful city ever flourish", while the one currently used is Civitas in bello et pace fidelis (A city faithful in peace and war). Both refer to Worcester's support for Royalists in the English Civil War.

Geography

Notable suburbs include Barbourne, Blackpole, Cherry Orchard, Claines, Diglis, Dines Green, Henwick, Northwick, Red Hill, Ronkswood, St Peter the Great (also known as St Peter's), Tolladine, Warndon and Warndon Villages. Most of Worcester is on the eastern side of the River Severn, including Saxons Lode. However, Henwick, Lower Wick, St John's and Dines Green are on the western side.

Climate
Worcester enjoys a temperate climate with generally warm summers and mild winters. However, it can experience more extreme weather and flooding is often a problem. In 1670, the River Severn burst its banks in the worst flood ever seen by the city. The closest flood height to the Flood of 1670 was when torrential rains caused the Severn to flood in July 2007, which is recorded in the Diglis Basin. This recurred in 2014.

During the winters of 2009–2010 and 2010–2011, the city underwent long periods of sub-freezing temperatures and heavy snowfalls. The Severn and the River Teme partly froze over in Worcester during this cold period. By contrast, Worcester recorded a temperature  on 2 August 1990. Between 1990 and 2003, weather data for the area was collected at Barbourne, Worcester. Since the closure of this weather station, the nearest is located at Pershore.

Green belt

Worcester is in a regional green belt that extends into the surrounding counties. It is set to reduce urban sprawl between the cities and towns in the nearby West Midlands conurbations centred round Birmingham and Coventry, to discourage further convergence, protect the identity of outlying communities, encourage brownfield reuse, and preserve nearby countryside. This is done by restricting inappropriate development within the designated areas and imposing strict conditions on permitted building.

Within the city boundary, there is a small area of green belt north of the Worcester and Birmingham canal and of the Perdiswell and Northwick suburbs. This is part of a larger isolated tract south of the main green belt that extends into the adjacent Wychavon district, minimising urban sprawl between Fernhill Heath and Droitwich Spa, and keeping them separate.

Demography and religion
The 2011 census put Worcester's population at 98,768. About 93.4 per cent were classed as white, of whom 89.1 percentage points were White British – higher than the national average. The largest religious group consists of Christians, with 63.7 per cent of the city's population. Those reporting no religion or declining to state an allegiance make up 32.3 per cent. The next largest religious group, Muslims, makes up 2.9 per cent. The ethnic minorities include people of Pakistani, Bangladeshi, Chinese, Indian, Italian and Polish origin, the largest single group being British Pakistanis, numbering around 1,900: 1.95 per cent of the population. This has led to Worcester containing a small but diverse range of religious groups; as well as the prominent Anglican Worcester Cathedral, there are also Catholic, United Reformed and Baptist churches, a large centre for the Church of Jesus Christ of Latter-day Saints, a small number of Islamic mosques and a number of smaller groups for oriental religions such as Buddhism and the International Society for Krishna Consciousness.

Worcester is the seat of a Church of England bishop, whose official signature is the personal Christian name followed by Wigorn. (abbreviating the Latin Wigorniensis, meaning of Worcester). This is also used occasionally to abbreviate the name of the county. The Archdeacon of Worcester, inducted in November 2014, had been Rector of St Barnabas with Christ Church in Worcester for eight years.

Economy

Glove-making

One flourishing industry was glove-making, which peaked between 1790 and 1820, when about 30,000 were employed by 150 firms. At this time nearly half the glove makers in Britain could be found in Worcestershire.

In the 19th century, the industry declined as import taxes on foreign competitors, mainly French, were much reduced. By the mid-20th century, only a few Worcester glove firms survived, as gloves became less fashionable and free trade enabled cheaper imports from the Far East. Nevertheless, at least three glove manufacturers survived into the late 20th century: Dent Allcroft, Fownes and Milore. Queen Elizabeth II's coronation gloves were designed by Emil Rich and manufactured in the Worcester Milore factory.

Manufacturing

The inter-war years saw rapid growth in engineering and machine-tool manufacturing firms such as James Archdale and H. W. Ward, castings for the motor industry from Worcester Windshields and Casements, valve design and manufacture from Alley & MacLellan, Sentinel Valve Works, mining machinery from Mining Engineering Company (MECO) – later part of Joy Mining Machinery – and open-top cans from Williamsons, although G. H. Williamson and Sons had become part of the Metal Box Co in 1930. Later the company became Carnaud Metal Box PLC.

Worcester Porcelain operated in Worcester until 2009, when the factory closed due to the recession. The site still houses the Museum of Royal Worcester, which is open daily to visitors.

One of Worcester's famous products, Lea & Perrins Worcestershire sauce, is made and bottled at a Midland Road factory, its home since 16 October 1897. Messrs Lea and Perrins originally partnered a chemist's shop on the site of the Debenhams's store in Crowngate Shopping Centre.

Worcester has what is claimed to be the oldest newspaper in the world still in publication: Berrow's Worcester Journal. It traces its descent from a news-sheet started in 1690.

The surprising foundry heritage of the city is represented by Morganite Crucible at Norton which produces graphitic shaped products and cements for use in the modern industry. The city is home to the European manufacturing plant of Yamazaki Mazak Corporation, a global Japanese machine tool builder established here in 1980.

Worcester Heating Systems was started in the city in 1962 by Cecil Duckworth. The company was bought by Bosch and renamed Worcester Bosch in 1996.

Retail trade
The Kays mail-order business was founded in Worcester in the 1880s and operated from various premises in the city until 2007. It was then bought out by Reality, owner of the Grattan catalogue. The Kays warehouse was demolished in 2008 and replaced by housing.

The city is a major retail centre, with several covered shopping centres to accommodate the major chains and many independent shops and restaurants, particularly in Friar Street and New Street.

Worcester's main shopping centre is the High Street, with several major retail chains. The High Street was partly modernised in 2005 amid controversy and further modernised in 2015, with current redevelopment of Cathedral Plaza and Lychgate Shopping Centre. Much of the protest came at the felling of old trees, the duration of the work (caused by weather and an archaeological find) and removal of flagstones outside the city's 18th-century Guildhall.

The other main thoroughfares are the Shambles and Broad Street. The Cross and its immediate surrounding area are the city's financial centre for most of Worcester's main bank branches.

There are three main covered shopping centres in the city centre: CrownGate Shopping Centre, Cathedral Plaza and Reindeer Court. There is also an unenclosed shopping area immediately east of the city centre called St Martin's Quarter. There are three retail parks, the Elgar and Blackpole retail parks located in the inner suburb of Blackpole, and the Shrub Hill Retail Park in neighbouring St. Martin's Quarter. Retailers such as ASDA, B & M and Aldi are all located close to St Martin's Quarter.

Landmarks

The most famous landmark in Worcester is the Anglican Worcester Cathedral. Officially the Cathedral Church of Christ and the Blessed Virgin Mary, it was known as Worcester Priory before the English Reformation. Construction began in 1084. Its crypt dates from the 11th century. It includes the only circular chapter house in the country. It houses the tombs of King John and Prince Arthur.

Near the cathedral is the spire of St Andrew's Church, known as Glover's Needle. The rest of the church was demolished in 1949.

The Parish Church of St Helen, on the north side of the High Street, is mainly medieval, with a west tower rebuilt in 1813. The east end, re-fenestration and porch were completed by Frederick Preedy in 1857–1863. There was further restoration, by Aston Webb in 1879–1880. It is a Grade II*listed building.

The high-water marks from the flood of 1670 and more recent flood levels are shown on a brass plate on a wall adjacent to the path along the river that leads to the cathedral.

Limited parts of Worcester's city wall remain.

The Hive, on the north side of the River Severn at the former cattle market site, is Worcester's joint public and university library and archive centre, heralded as "the first of its kind in Europe", and a prominent feature on the skyline. With seven towers and a golden rooftop, it has gained recognition, winning two international awards for building design and sustainability.

The city's three main open spaces Cripplegate Park, Gheluvelt Park and Fort Royal Park, the last on the site of an English Civil War battle. In addition, there is an open area known as Pitchcroft to the north of the city centre on the east bank of the River Severn, which is a public space except on days when it is used for horse racing. Gheluvelt Park commemorates the part played by Worcestershire Regiment's 2nd Battalion in the Battle of Gheluvelt in the First World War.

A statue of Sir Edward Elgar, commissioned from Kenneth Potts and unveiled in 1981, stands at the end of Worcester High Street facing the cathedral, yards from the original location of his father's music shop, which was demolished in the 1960s. Elgar's birthplace was the nearby village of Broadheath.

There are also two large wooded areas in the city, Perry Wood and Nunnery Wood, covering 12 and 21 hectares. Perry Wood is often said to be where Oliver Cromwell met and made a pact with the Devil. Nunnery Wood is integral to the adjacent Worcester Woods Country Park, itself next door to County Hall on the east side of the city.

Transport

Road
The M5 Motorway runs north–south immediately to the east of the city. It is accessed by junction 6 (Worcester North) and junction 7 (Worcester South). It connects Worcester to most parts of the country, including London, which is only  using the A44 via the Cotswolds and M40.

The main roads through the city include the A449 road south-west to Malvern and north to Kidderminster. The A44 runs south-east to Evesham and west to Leominster and Aberystwyth and crosses Worcester Bridge. The A38 trunk road runs south to Tewkesbury and Gloucester and north-north-east to Droitwich and Bromsgrove and Birmingham. The A4103 goes west-south-west to Hereford. The A422 heads east to Alcester, branching from the A44 a mile east of the M5. The city is partly ringed by A4440.

Carrington Bridge on the A4440 is the second road bridge across the Severn, linking the A38 from Worcester towards Gloucester with the A449 to Malvern. It is one of Worcestershire's busiest roads. The single-carriageway bridge is due to be doubled by 2021, making the Southern Link Road dual between junction 7 of the M5 and Powick Roundabout.

Rail

Worcester has three railway stations. Worcester Foregate Street and Worcester Shrub Hill are in the city centre. A third station on the edge of the city, Worcestershire Parkway, opened in 2020.

The Cotswold line towards Great Malvern and Hereford crosses Foregate Street on an arched cast-iron bridge, remodelled by the Great Western Railway in 1908 with a decorative cast-iron exterior serving no structural purpose. Between Foregate Street and the St John's area of the city, heading towards Malvern and Hereford, the line crosses the Worcester viaduct over the River Severn.

Worcester Shrub Hill lies about a mile east of the city centre on Shrub Hill Road. It is on part of today's Cross Country Route, looping off the Birmingham to Gloucester railway.

Alongside Worcester Shrub Hill station in Shrub Hill Road were the Worcester Engine Works. Their polychrome brick building was erected about 1864 and probably designed by Thomas Dickson. However, only 84 locomotives were built there and the works closed in 1871. The chairman was Alexander Clunes Sheriff.

Both stations have frequent trains to Birmingham via Droitwich Spa, through Kidderminster and Stourbridge into Birmingham Snow Hill and Birmingham Moor Street then onwards usually to Dorridge or Whitlocks End, or via Bromsgrove and University and Birmingham New Street. These services are run by West Midlands Trains. From both stations, trains run to Pershore, Evesham and onto the Cotswolds, Oxford and London.

Buses
The main operator in and around the city is First Midland Red. A few smaller operators provide services in Worcester, including Astons, DRM and LMS Travel. Diamond Bus operates a service from Kidderminster to communities along the A449. The terminus and interchange for many bus services is Crowngate bus station in the city centre.

The city had two park and ride sites: off the A38 in Perdiswell and at Sixways Stadium next to the M5. Worcestershire County Council voted to close both in 2014 as part of a package of cutbacks. The service at Sixways Stadium has since been reinstated, with LMS Travel operating the W3 route to Worcestershire Royal Hospital, but avoiding the city centre bus station.

Air
Worcester's nearest major airport is Birmingham, which is accessible by road and rail. Gloucestershire Airport is about 25 miles away and provided general aviation connections and scheduled services with Citywing to Jersey, the Isle of Man and Belfast. Citywing ceased trading in 2017 after entering administration.

Cycling
 Worcester is on routes 45 and 46 of the National Cycle Network. There are various routes around the city. Diglis Bridge, a pedestrian and Cycle bridge across the Severn, opened in 2010 to St Peter's with Lower Wick.

Waterways
The River Severn is navigable through Worcester, and here it links to the Worcester and Birmingham Canal, which connects Worcester with Birmingham and the rest of the national canal network. Historically used for the transport of goods, the canal network is now mostly used for leisure boating.

Education

The University of Worcester was awarded university status in 2005 by the Privy Council, having been known since 1997 as University College Worcester (UCW) and before that as Worcester College of Higher Education. From 2005 to 2010 it was the fastest growing university in the UK, more than doubling its student population. The university has an independent Worcester Students Union institution. The city is also home to two colleges, Worcester Sixth Form College and Heart of Worcestershire College.

High schools
The high schools located in the city are Bishop Perowne CofE College, Blessed Edward Oldcorne Catholic College, Christopher Whitehead Language College, Tudor Grange Academy Worcester, Nunnery Wood High School and New College Worcester. The last caters for blind and partially sighted pupils aged 11–18.

Independent schools
Worcester is the seat of three independent schools. The Royal Grammar School, founded in 1291 and Alice Ottley School merged in 2007. The King's School was re-founded in 1541 under King Henry VIII, and is a co-educational day school standing next to Worcester Cathedral. St Mary's School, a girls' Catholic school, was the one remaining single-sex independent school, but closed in July 2014. Other independent schools include the Independent Christian School, the River School in Fernhill Heath and New College Worcester.

Hospitals
The Worcestershire Royal Hospital is the principal NHS hospital serving the city and county of Worcester. It opened in 2002, replacing the Worcester Royal Infirmary.

The former Worcester Eye Hospital was based in the Grade II listed Thornloe House, Barbourne Road, from 1940 to 1995.

St Oswald's Hospital on the Tything was founded as alsmhouses and is now a care home.

Sport

Worcester Warriors, a Premiership Rugby Union team, which plays at Sixways Stadium
Worcestershire County Cricket Club, whose home ground is New Road
Worcester City Football Club
Worcester Sorcerers Baseball Club, whose home ground is Norton Parish Hall
Worcester Hockey Club has teams entered in the West Hockey Leagues.
Worcester St Johns Cycling Club
Worcester Wolves, a professional basketball team in the British Basketball League, plays at the Worcester Arena.
Worcester Racecourse is on an open area known as "Pitchcroft" on the east bank of the River Severn.

Culture

Festivals and shows
Every three years Worcester becomes home to the Three Choirs Festival, which dates from the 18th century and is credited with being the oldest music festival in the British Isles. The location rotates between the cathedral cities of Gloucester, Hereford and Worcester. Famous for championing English music, especially that of Elgar, Vaughan Williams and Gustav Holst, Worcester hosted the festival in July 2017, but had to postpone its 2020 festival until 2021.

The Worcester Festival established in 2003 by Chris Jaeger MBE occurs in August and consists of music, theatre, cinema and workshop events, along with a beer festival. It ends with a free firework display on the banks of the River Severn on the Monday of the August bank holiday. The artistic director is now actor, director and writer, Ben Humphrey.

For one weekend a year the city plays host to the Worcester Music Festival – a weekend of original music performed by predominantly local bands and musicians. All performances are free and take place around the city centre in bars, clubs, community buildings, churches and the central library.

Founded in 2012, the Worcester Film Festival, places Worcestershire on the film-making map and encourages local people to get involved in making film. The first festival took place at the Hive and including screenings, workshops and talks.

The Victorian-themed Christmas Fayre is a busy event in late November/early December, with over 200 stalls lining the streets, and over 100,000 visitors.

The CAMRA Worcester Beer, Cider and Perry Festival takes place for three days each August on Pitchcroft Race Course. It is the largest beer festival in the West Midlands and in the UK top ten with attendances of around 14,000.

The Worcester Vegan Market began in 2021 and takes place in late spring and fall. The Vegan Market fills High Street and Cathedral Square with vegan vendors, vegan food sellers, and vegan food trucks.

Arts and cinema

The famous 18th-century actress Sarah Siddons made her acting début at the Theatre Royal in Angel Street. Her sister, the novelist Ann Julia Kemble Hatton, otherwise Ann of Swansea, was born in the city. Also born in Worcester was Matilda Alice Powles, better known as Vesta Tilley, a leading male impersonator and music hall artiste.

In present-day Worcester, the Swan Theatre stages professional touring and local amateur productions and is the base for the Worcester Repertory Company. Past heads have included John Doyle and David Wood OBE. The current artistic director of the company and the theatre is Chris Jaeger MBE.

Stars who started their careers in the Worcester Repertory Company and the Swan Theatre include Imelda Staunton, Sean Pertwee, Celia Imrie, Rufus Norris, Kevin Whately and Bonnie Langford. Directors too have made a name for themselves: Phyllida Lloyd starting her career as an associate under John Doyle.

Huntingdon Hall is a historic church now used as venue for an eclectic range of musical and comedy performances. Recent acts have included Van Morrison, Eddie Izzard, Jack Dee, Omid Djalili and Jason Manford. The Marrs Bar is a venue for gigs and stand-up comedy. Worcester has two multi-screen cinemas; the Vue Cinema complex is located in Friar Street and the Odeon in Foregate Street – both were 3D-equipped by March 2010.

The northern suburb of Northwick has the Art Deco Northwick Cinema. Built in 1938, it contains one of only two remaining interiors in Britain designed by John Alexander. The original perspective drawings are held by RIBA. It was a bingo hall from 1966 to 1982, then empty until 1991, a music venue until 1996, and empty again until autumn 2006, when it became an antiques and lifestyle centre, owned by Grey's Interiors, which was previously located in the Tything. Worcester was home to the electronic music producer and collaborator Mike Paradinas and his record label Planet Mu, until the label moved to London in 2007.

Media

Newspapers

Radio stations

In popular culture

Mildred Arkell
The depression that hit the Worcester glove industry in the 1820s and 1830s is the background to a three-volume novel, Mildred Arkell, by the Victorian novelist Ellen Wood (then Mrs Henry Wood).

Cadfael Chronicles
The well-researched historical novel The Virgin in the Ice, part of Ellis Peters' The Cadfael Chronicles series, depicts Worcester at the time of the Anarchy. It begins with the words:
"It was early in November of 1139 that the tide of civil war, lately so sluggish and inactive, rose suddenly to wash over the city of Worcester, wash away half of its livestock, property and women and send all those of its inhabitants who could get away in time scurrying for their lives northwards away from the marauders." (These are mentioned as arriving from Gloucester, leaving a long lasting legacy of bitterness between the two cities.)

Twinning
Worcester is twinned with:

Kleve, Germany
Le Vésinet, France
Worcester, Massachusetts, USA
Ukmergė, Lithuania

In February 2009 Worcester City Council's Twinning Association began discussing an application to twin Worcester with the Palestinian city of Gaza. Councillor Alan Amos introduced the application, which was passed at its first stage by a majority of 35–6, but later rejected by the executive committee of the City of Worcester Twinning Association for lack of funding.

Notable people

In birth order:
Hannah Snell (1723–1792), famous for impersonating a man and enlisting in the Royal Marines, was born and brought up in Worcester.
Elizabeth Blower (c. 1757/63 – post-1816), novelist, poet and actress, was born and raised in Worcester.
Ann Hatton (1764–1838), writer of the Kemble family, was born in Worcester.
James White (1775–1820), founder of first advertising agency in 1800 in London, was born in Worcester.
John Mathew Gutch (1776–1861), journalist, lived with his second wife at Barbourne, a suburb north of Worcester, from 1823 until his death.
Jabez Allies (1787–1856), a Worcestershire folklorist and antiquarian lived at Lower Wick, now part of Worcester.
Sir Charles Hastings (1794–1866), British Medical Association founder, lived in Worcester for most of his life.
Revd Thomas Davis, a hymn-writer born in Worcester in 1804
Philip Henry Gosse, naturalist, was born in Worcester in 1810.
Mrs. Henry Wood (1814–1887), writer, was born in Worcester.
Alexander Clunes Sheriff (1816–1878), City Alderman, businessman and Liberal MP, grew up in Worcester.
Edward Leader Williams (1828–1910), designer of the Manchester Ship Canal, was born and brought up at Diglis House in Worcester.
Benjamin Williams Leader (1831–1923), brother of previous, landscape artist
Sir Thomas Brock (1847–1922), sculptor, best known for the London Victoria Memorial, was born in Worcester in 1847. Worcestershire Royal Hospital is in a road named after him.
Vesta Tilley (1864–1952), music hall performer who adopted this stage name aged 11, was born in Worcester. She became a noted male impersonator.
Sir Edward Elgar, composer, was born in 1857 in Lower Broadheath, just outside Worcester, and he lived in the city from the age of two. His father ran a music shop in High Street; a statue of Elgar stands near the original site. His early musical career was based around the city, and his first major work was commissioned for the Three Choirs Festival there.
William Morris, Lord Nuffield (1877–1963), founder of Morris Motors and philanthropist, spent the first three years in Worcester.
Geoffrey Studdert Kennedy (1883–1929, "Woodbine Willy"), poet and author, was Vicar of St Paul's Church. As an army chaplain in the First World War he would hand out Woodbine cigarettes to men in the trenches.
Ernest Payne (1884–1961) was born in Worcester and rode for St Johns Cycling Club, winning a gold medal in team pursuit at the 1908 Summer Olympics in London.
Sheila Scott (1922–1988), aviator, was born in Worcester.
Louise Johnson (1940–2012), biochemist and protein crystallographer, was born in Worcester.
Timothy Garden, Baron Garden (1944–2007), Air Marshal and Liberal Democrat politician, was born and educated in Worcester.
Dave Mason (born 1946), musician, singer, songwriter and guitarist, was born in Worcester.
Lee Cornes (born 1951), comedian and actor known for television roles in Blackadder, The Young Ones and Bottom series, was born in Worcester.
David McGreavy (born 1951, the "Monster of Worcester"), lived and committed child murders in Worcester.
Imran Khan (born 1952), cricketer and Prime Minister of Pakistan, attended the Royal Grammar School Worcester and played cricket for Worcestershire County Cricket Club (1971–1976).
Stephen Dorrell (born 1952), English Conservative politician and former government minister, was born in Worcester.
Karl Hyde (born 1957), English musician, frontman of trance music group Underworld was born in Worcester.
Vincenzo Nicoli (born 1958), British actor.
Donncha O'Callaghan (born 1979), Irish Rugby Union player. Joined Worcester Warriors in 2015 from Munster Rugby Irish and British and Irish Lions International.
Ben Humphrey (born 1986), British actor, director and writer, associate director of the Worcester Repertory Company.
Kit Harington (born 1986), actor, lived in Worcester attended The Chantry School and Worcester Sixth Form College. He plays the character Jon Snow in Game of Thrones.
Kai Alexander (born 1997), British actor, born in Worcester.

See also
Jewish community of Worcester
Bishop of Worcester
List of mayors of Worcester

References

General Worcester sources

Sources: Medieval history

Sources: Civil War

General sources

Further reading

External links

Worcester City Council
History of the City of Worcester

 
Populated places on the River Severn
County towns in England
Local government in Worcestershire
Non-metropolitan districts of Worcestershire
Cities in the West Midlands (region)
Towns in Worcestershire
Boroughs in England